Kennebec Estuary Land Trust (KELT) is a community-based organization in Maine involving members from Arrowsic, Bath, Bowdoinham, Dresden, West Bath, Georgetown, Westport Island, and Woolwich. KELT does their work through conservation easements, property donation and outright purchase. They collaborate with state and federal agencies and private conservation organizations within the Maine Wetlands Protection Coalition.

History
In the late 1980s the Arrowsic Conservation Commission began discussing the need for a local land conservation organization. These discussions led to a decision to hold a meeting in which local representatives from Arrowsic, Bath, Georgetown, Phippsburg, West Bath and Woolwich would discuss such issues. Soon after, an organizational committee was formed. In the winter of 1991, KELT received its first easement, made up of a major portion on Long Island across from Fort Popham. The area covers more than 80 acres and two miles of shoreline. KELT was originally known as the Lower Kennebec Region Land Trust until renamed by a member vote accepting this and other changes to the Bylaws in February 2009. As of 2009, the Kennebec Estuary Land Trust owned 700 acres of land and had 951 acres of land under easement.

Kennebec Estuary Land Trust Leadership
The Executive Director of Kennebec Estuary Land Trust and main contact is Carrie Kinne. The President of Kennebec Estuary Land Trust is Dennis Dunbar. The Trust is staffed by seven individuals and has approximately 200 members.

Kennebec Estuary
The Kennebec Estuary is home for every species of waterfowl that uses the Atlantic flyway. The center of the estuary is Merrymeeting Bay, where six rivers meet in an inland freshwater tidal delta.

Mission

“Conserve, restore, and instill appreciation of the land and water resources of the Kennebec Estuary to benefit today’s communities and future generations.”

Conserved Land
 Lilly Pond Community Forest
 Merrymeeting Fields Preserve
 Thorne Head Preserve
 Sewall Woods Preserve
 Higgins Mountain Preserve
 Green Point Preserve
 Bonyun Preserve
 Weber Kelly Preserve
 Morse Pond Reserve

References

Nature conservation organizations based in the United States
Organizations based in Maine
Sagadahoc County, Maine
Kennebec River
Land trusts in the United States
Georgetown, Maine